The 2016 Volvo Car Open was a women's tennis event on the 2016 WTA Tour. It took place between April 4 – 10, 2016. It was the 44th edition of the Charleston Open tournament and a Premier level tournament. The event was hosted at the Family Circle Tennis Center, on Daniel Island, Charleston, United States. It was the only event of the clay court season played on green clay.

Sloane Stephens won the singles event while Caroline Garcia and Kristina Mladenovic captured the doubles crown.

Points and prize money

Point distribution

Prize money

Singles main draw entrants

Seeds 

1 Rankings as of March 21, 2016.

Other entrants 
The following players received wildcards into the main draw:
  Frances Altick
  Louisa Chirico
  Shelby Rogers

The following player received entry using a protected ranking into the main draw:
  Peng Shuai

The following players received entry from the qualifying draw:
  Cindy Burger
  Çağla Büyükakçay
  Sesil Karatantcheva
  Lesley Kerkhove
  Aleksandra Krunić
  Kristína Kučová
  Naomi Osaka
  Elena Vesnina

The following players received entry as lucky losers:
  Jana Čepelová
  Patricia Maria Țig

Withdrawals 
Before the tournament
  Mona Barthel → replaced by  Tatjana Maria
  Petra Cetkovská (right thigh injury) → replaced by  Jana Čepelová
  Mariana Duque Mariño → replaced by  Anastasija Sevastova
  Jelena Janković (right shoulder injury) → replaced by  Patricia Maria Țig
  Varvara Lepchenko → replaced by  Alison Riske

Retirements 
  Eugenie Bouchard
  Angelique Kerber

Doubles main draw entrants

Seeds 

1 Rankings as of March 21, 2016.

Other entrants 
The following pairs received wildcards into the doubles main draw:
  Hadley Berg /  Paige Cline
  Madison Keys /  Sloane Stephens

Retirements 
  Abigail Spears (right calf injury)

Champions

Singles 

  Sloane Stephens def.  Elena Vesnina 7–6(7–4), 6–2

Doubles 

  Caroline Garcia /  Kristina Mladenovic def.  Bethanie Mattek-Sands /  Lucie Šafářová, 6–2, 7–5

References 

www.volvocaropen.com singles draw
www.volvocaropen.com doubles draw
www.volvocaropen.com singles qualifying draw

External links 
 

2016 WTA Tour
Volvo
2016 in sports in South Carolina
April 2016 sports events in the United States
2016 Volvo Car Open